Anti-nuclear power groups have emerged in every country that has had a nuclear power programme. Protest movements against nuclear power first emerged in the US, at the local level, and spread quickly to Europe and the rest of the world. National nuclear campaigns emerged in the late 1970s. Fuelled by the Three Mile Island accident and the Chernobyl disaster, the anti-nuclear power movement mobilised political and economic forces which for some years "made nuclear energy untenable in many countries".

Some of these anti-nuclear power organisations are reported to have developed considerable expertise on nuclear power and energy issues. In 1992, the chairman of the Nuclear Regulatory Commission said that "his agency had been pushed in the right direction on safety issues because of the pleas and protests of nuclear watchdog groups".

International
 Friends of the Earth International, a network of environmental organizations in 77 countries.
 Greenpeace International, a non-governmental environmental organization with offices in over 41 countries and headquarters in Amsterdam, Netherlands. 
 International Network of Engineers and Scientists for Global Responsibility
 Nuclear Information and Resource Service 
 Pax Christi International, a Catholic group which took a "sharply anti-nuclear stand". 
 Pugwash Conferences on Science and World Affairs
 Socialist International, the world body of social democratic parties.
 Sōka Gakkai, a peace-orientated Buddhist organisation, which held anti-nuclear exhibitions in Japanese cities during the late 1970s, and gathered 10 million signatures on petitions calling for the abolition of nuclear weapons. 
 World Information Service on Energy, based in Amsterdam, The Netherlands
 World Union for Protection of Life

Australia
Campaign Against Nuclear Energy
Greenpeace Australia Pacific

Canada
Canadian Coalition for Nuclear Responsibility 
Pembina Institute 
Sortir du nucléaire (Canada)

France
Sortir du nucléaire (France)
CRIIRAD
WISE-Paris
Groupement des scientifiques pour l'information sur l'énergie nucléaire

Japan
Citizens' Nuclear Information Center
Green Action Japan

New Zealand
Greenpeace Aotearoa New Zealand

South Africa
Koeberg Alert

Spain 

ETA

United Kingdom
Cumbrians Opposed to a Radioactive Environment 
Friends of the Earth (EWNI) 
Friends of the Earth Scotland
Sustainable Development Commission

United States
Arms Control Association
Abalone Alliance 
Clamshell Alliance
Institute for Energy and Environmental Research 
Musicians United for Safe Energy 
Natural Resources Defense Council
New England Coalition
Shad Alliance
Sierra Club

See also
List of nuclear power groups
Non-nuclear future
List of anti-nuclear groups in the United States

References

 
Lists of environmental organizations
Nuclear technology-related lists